Basil Alexander Paterson (April 27, 1926 – April 16, 2014) was an American labor lawyer and politician. He served in the New York State Senate from 1966 to 1971 and as secretary of state of New York under Governor Hugh Carey from 1979 to 1983. In 1970, Paterson was the Democratic nominee for Lieutenant Governor of New York on the Arthur Goldberg ticket. Paterson's son David served as governor from 2008 to 2010.

Birth and early life
Paterson was born in Harlem on April 27, 1926, the son of Leonard James and Evangeline Alicia (Rondon) Paterson. His father was born on the island of Carriacou in the Grenadines and arrived in New York City aboard the S.S. Vestris on May 16, 1917. His mother was born in Kingston, Jamaica and arrived in Philadelphia on September 9, 1919, aboard the S.S. Vestnorge (with a final destination of New York City). A stenographer by profession, the former Miss Rondon once served as a secretary for Marcus Garvey.

In 1942, at the age of 16, Paterson graduated from De Witt Clinton High School in the Bronx.  He was shaped by his experiences with racism early on.  "I got out of high school when I was 16," Paterson told The New York Times columnist Bob Herbert, "and the first real job I had was with a wholesale house in the old Port Authority building, down on 18th Street. We'd pack and load these trucks that went up and down in huge elevators. Every year there would be a Christmas party for the employees at some local hotel. Those of us who worked in the shipping department were black. We got paid not to go to the party."

Education 
Paterson attended college at St. John's University, but his studies were interrupted by a two-year stint in the U.S. Army during World War II. After serving honorably, he returned to St. John's to complete his undergraduate studies. While there, he was active in social and community service organizations including the Kappa Alpha Psi fraternity—where he joined the ranks of the Omicron chapter of New York (now at Columbia University) in 1947. Paterson graduated with a B.S. degree in biology in 1948. He was later admitted to St. John's University Law School, where he received a Juris Doctor degree in 1951.

Political career

Harlem Clubhouse
Paterson became involved in Democrat politics in Harlem in the 1950s.  Along with former Mayor David Dinkins, Manhattan Borough President Percy Sutton, and Congressman Charles Rangel, he was a leader of the influential Gang of Four (also known as the "Harlem Clubhouse").

New York State Senate
Paterson was elected to the New York State Senate in 1966 and represented the Upper West Side and Harlem in the 176th, 177th and 178th New York State Legislatures. While in office, he played a key role in preventing Columbia University from building a gym in Morningside Park.

Lieutenant Governor campaign 
In 1970, Paterson vacated his senate seat to run for Lieutenant Governor of New York alongside former U.S. Supreme Court Justice Arthur Goldberg.  In the primary, Paterson received the most 100,000 more than votes than his ticket mate, who ran a close race against Howard Samuels. During the election, Albany machine boss Daniel P. O'Connell stated "He's the only white man on the ticket."

The Goldberg/Paterson ticket ultimately lost to Republican incumbents Gov. Nelson Rockefeller and Lt. Gov. Malcolm Wilson. Paterson was passed over for the 1974 Governor's race even though he was the highest vote-getter in 1970. His son, David Paterson, would go on to become Lt. Governor in January 2007.

Appointments 
In 1972, Paterson was the first elected African American Vice Chairman of the Democratic National Committee.

In 1978, Paterson was appointed Deputy Mayor of New York City by Ed Koch. He stepped down from that post in 1979 to become Secretary of State of New York in Governor Hugh Carey's administration.  Paterson was the first African-American to hold the post, and he served until 1983.

As Koch prepared to seek a third term in 1985, Paterson explored a mayoral candidacy of his own but ultimately chose not to run.

Mario Cuomo appointed Paterson to the board of the Port Authority of New York and New Jersey in 1989. Paterson served from 1989-95.

Andrew Cuomo appointed Paterson to the Board of the Port Authority of New York and New Jersey in 2013.

Paterson chaired the New York City Mayor’s Judiciary Committee for four years and the New York State Governor’s
Judicial Screening Panel for the Second Department for eight years. He ended his tenure at the Commission on Judicial
Nominations after serving for twelve years. Paterson was appointed by Mario Cuomo to the State Committee's and Michael Bloomberg to the City's Judicary Committee.

Personal life and family
Paterson was Catholic. Outside of public service, he was a member of Meyer, Suozzi, English & Klein, P.C. and co-chaired the firm's labor law practice.

Paterson was the father of 55th Governor of New York David Paterson. David, prior to his tenure as Governor, served in the state Senate from 1985 to 2006. David ran at the behest of Percy Sutton, after the death of Leon Bogues. David rose to the post of state senate minority leader from 2003 to 2006. He was subsequently elected lieutenant governor in 2006 on a ticket with Gov. Eliot Spitzer. David Paterson succeeded to the governor's office upon Spitzer's resignation on March 17, 2008. Basil was present at his son's swearing in and was recognized by his son during his speech.

Death and legacy 
Paterson died on April 16, 2014, at Mount Sinai Hospital in Manhattan, shortly before his 88th birthday. In 2020 David Paterson published a biography of his father titled Black, Blind, & In Charge: A Story of Visionary Leadership and Overcoming Adversity.

Further reading
Paterson, David "Black, Blind, & In Charge: A Story of Visionary Leadership and Overcoming Adversity." New York, New York, 2020
Dinkins, David, A Mayor's Life: Governing New York's Gorgeous Mosaic, PublicAffairs Books, 2013
Rangel, Charles B.; Wynter, Leon(2007)And I Haven't Had a Bad Day Since: From the Streets of Harlem to the Halls of Congress New York: St. Martin's Press. 
Walker, John C.The Harlem Fox: J. Raymond Jones at Tammany 1920:1970, New York: State University New York Press, 1989.
Howell, Ron Boss of Black Brooklyn: The Life and Times of Bertram L. Baker Fordham University Press Bronx, New York 2018

See also 
1970 New York gubernatorial election
1970 New York state election

References

1926 births
2014 deaths
20th-century American lawyers
20th-century American politicians
21st-century American lawyers
African-American Catholics
African-American state legislators in New York (state)
American labor lawyers
American people of Carriacouan descent
American politicians of Jamaican descent
David Paterson
DeWitt Clinton High School alumni
Lawyers from New York City
Democratic Party New York (state) state senators
Politicians from New York City
Secretaries of State of New York (state)